The Kings of Byblos were the rulers of Byblos, the ancient Phoenician city in what is now Lebanon.

Scholars have pieced together the fragmented list from various archaeological finds since the 19th century.

Early period
 c.1800s BC Abichemou I
 c.1790s BC Yapachemou Abi I
 c.1700s BC Rib-Hadda, Yakin
 c.1500s BC Yantin-Ammu, Abichemou II, Yapachemou Abi II, Eglia

Egyptian period
 c.1340s BC Rib-Adda
 c.1320 BC Ilirabi / Ili-Rapih
 c.1320? BC Azirou / Aziru (King of the Amurru kingdom)
 1100s BC Zakar Baal

Phoenician golden age
 1000s BC Ahiram
 c.1000 BC Zakar Baal (II?)
 c.980 BC Ithobaal
 c.940 BC Yahimilik
 c.930 BC Abi-Baal
 c.920 BC Elibaal
 c.900 BC Safatba'al (I)

Assyrian period
 c.735 BC Safatba‘al II
 c.710 BC Urumilki / Urumiku
 c.670 BC Milkiashapa / Milkiasaph
 c.650 BC Yehawmelek

Persian period
 c. 500 BC Safatba'al (III)
 c. 480 BC Urimilk II
 c. 470 BC Yeḥarbaal (son of Urimilk II)
 c. 450 BC Yehawmilk (son of Yeḥarbaal)

Based on coins:
 c. 425 BC Elpaal (’LP‘L); possibly married to queen Batnoam
 c. 400 BC ‘Ozbaal (‘ZB’L; son of Batnoam)
 c. 375 BC Urimilk III (’WRMLK)
 332 BC ‘Aynel (‘YN’L; Enylus)

Roman period
 68 BC Cinyrus

See also
King of Tyre
King of Sidon

References

Byblos
 
Heads of state of Lebanon